The Journal of the History of Collections is a peer reviewed academic journal of the history of collectors and collecting. It is published by Oxford University Press.

References 

Oxford University Press academic journals
History journals